A vow of silence is a vow to maintain silence. Although it is commonly associated with monasticism, no major monastic order takes a vow of silence. Even the most fervently silent orders such as the Carthusians have time in their schedule for talking.

Recently, the vow of silence has been embraced by some in secular society as means of protest or of deepening their spirituality. Silence is often seen as essential to deepening a relationship with God. It is also considered a virtue in some religions.

In Western Christian traditions such as Catholicism and Lutheranism, the Great Silence is the period of time beginning at the canonical hour of Compline, in which votarists are silent until the first office of the next day, Lauds.

Examples

Religious examples 
Despite the common misconception, no major Christian monasteries or religious orders take such a vow. However, most monasteries have specific times (magnum silentium, work silence, times of prayer, etc.) and places (the chapel, the refectory, etc.) where speaking is prohibited unless absolutely necessary. Even outside of these times and places, useless and idle words are forbidden. In active orders, the members speak according to the needs of their various duties.

In the Indian religions, religious silence is called Mauna and the name for a sage muni (see, for example Sakyamuni) literally means "silent one". In Buddhism, it is also explicitly stated that "one does not become a sage simply because of a vow of silence" due to the prescription for disciples to also teach the Buddhist doctrine. The vow of silence is also relevant in the training of novices and is often cited as a way to resist the allures of samsara, including those posed by the opposite sex. Buddhist monks who take a vow of silence often carry an iron staff called khakkhara, which makes a metallic noise to frighten away animals. Since they cannot speak, the rattle of the staff also announces their arrival when they start begging for alms.

Mahatma Gandhi observed one day of silence a week, every Monday, and would not break this discipline for any reason.

Non-religious examples 
Additionally, a vow of silence can be made to express a bold statement. This type may be to make a statement about issues such as child poverty. An example of this is The November 30th Vow of Silence for Free The Children in which students in Canada take a 24-hour vow of silence to speak up against poverty and child labour. In the United States, the Day of Silence is the GLSEN’s annual day of action to spread awareness about the effects of the bullying and harassment of lesbian, gay, bisexual, transgender, queer, and questioning (LGBTQ) students. Students take a day-long vow of silence to symbolically represent the silencing of LGBTQ students. The Day of Silence has been held each year in April since 1996. From 2011 to 2017, the Day of Silence was held on the second Friday in April except for April 11, 2014; in 2018 it was observed on Friday, April 27. A more ancient example of a non-religious vow of silence is Pythagoras, who imposed a strict rule of silence on his disciples.

In pop culture

 In Monty Python's Life of Brian, a hermit holds a vow of silence until the titular character breaks his foot.
 The 2006 film, Little Miss Sunshine, featured Dwayne, a Nietzsche-reading teenager, taking a vow of silence until he can accomplish his dream of becoming a test pilot. 
 Garu, a character in the cartoon show, Pucca, was mentioned to have taken a vow of silence. 
 The Poopsmith, a character in the long-running Web Series Homestar Runner, has taken a vow of silence, and has only had two speaking roles in the 19 years the series has been running. 
 "The Cartoon", a season 9 episode of Seinfeld, featured Kramer taking a vow of silence due to his tendency to bluntly reveal things and not keep them to himself. 
 The 2009 movie G.I. Joe: The Rise of Cobra featured Snake Eyes taking a vow of silence. 
 The 2011 movie The Hangover: Part II featured a Buddhist monk taking a vow of silence as part of the film's plot. 
 The 2017 television show The Good Place featured Jianyu, a Buddhist monk, taking a vow of silence. 
 The HBO TV series Curb Your Enthusiasm (Season 8, Episode 5) featured a character taking a vow of silence. The episode title was also called "Vow of Silence". 
 In the book The Wind-Up Bird Chronicle (ねじまき鳥クロニクル Nejimakitori Kuronikuru), the character Cinnamon Akasaka may have taken a vow of silence. 
 In the BBC series Call the Midwife, the Anglican nuns observe the Great Silence from Compline until the morning, as repeatedly referenced throughout all 9 seasons (as of December 2020).
 The 2006 song "Vow of Silence" by Lemon Demon is sung from the perspective of a talkative person accepting that they won't be able to say everything, so they'll take a vow of silence instead.

See also 
 Day of Silence
 Fasting
 Meditation, often silent (but sometimes a mantra is involved) and often originally religious
 Minute of Silence
 Moment of Silence
 Remembrance Day
 Silence procedure
 Vrata

References

Bibliography 

 

Silence
Spirituality
Meditation
Hindu practices
Jain practices
Monasticism
Silence